The Ensisheim meteorite is a stony meteorite that fell on November 7, 1492 in a wheat field outside the walled town of Ensisheim in then Alsace, Further Germany (now France). The meteorite can still be seen in Ensisheim's museum, the sixteenth-century Musée de la Régence. It is the oldest stony European meteorite fall from which there is still some meteoritic material preserved.

Composition

Contemporary response

The fall of the meteorite through the Earth's atmosphere was observed as a fireball at a distance of up to 150 kilometers from where it eventually landed. Residents of the walled town and nearby farms and villages gathered at the location to raise the meteorite from its impact hole and began removing pieces of it. A local magistrate interfered with the destruction of the stone, in order to preserve the object for King Maximilian, the son of the reigning Holy Roman Emperor Frederick III. A piece of the meteorite was sent to Cardinal Piccolomini (later Pope Pius III) at the Vatican along with a number of related verses written by Brant.

King Maximilian, who was on his way to a campaign against France, ordered for it to be preserved at a local church. He and his advisors decided that the meteorite was a good omen. It was subsequently utilized for propaganda against France. One reason for the quick spreading of the story throughout Europe was the loud volume of the meteorite impact (contemporaries reportedly heard the sound at least 100 miles away). Another reason was the use of broadsheets with dramatic pictures under the direction of the poet Sebastian Brandt (1458–1521).

Brandt created broadsheets in Latin and German with a poem about the meteorite, describing it as an omen for the king's success in battles against France.

Two months later, Maximilian defeated a far larger French army than his own at the Battle of Senlis, which prompted Brandt to produce another broadsheet reminding the readers about his prediction. In 1493, he wrote another broadsheet. By this time, the French were no longer a threat (because Maximilian had just signed the Treaty of Senlis with them), so Brandt directed his readers' attention towards the Turks.

Brandt, a satirist and author of Das Narrenschiff, also described the meteorite and its fall in the poem "Loose Leaves Concerning the Fall of the Meteorite". The fall is also described in Folio 257 of the Nuremberg Chronicle.

The German artist Albrecht Dürer possibly sketched his observation of the meteorite's fall on the reverse of his painting St. Jerome in the Wilderness.

References

External links
 

Meteorites found in France
Meteorite falls
1490s in the Holy Roman Empire
1490s in France
Maximilian I, Holy Roman Emperor